Politics, Religion & Ideology is a quarterly peer-reviewed academic journal covering research on the politics of illiberal ideologies, including the impact of religious radicalism. It is published by Taylor & Francis and was established in 2000 as Totalitarian Movements and Political Religions, obtaining its current name in 2011. The editor-in-chief is Naveed S. Sheikh (Keele University).

Abstracting and indexing 
The journal is abstracted and indexed in Scopus, EBSCOhost, Sociological Abstracts, CSA Worldwide Political Science Abstracts, and International Bibliography of the Social Sciences.

See also 
 Political religion

External links 
 

Publications established in 2000
Political science journals
English-language journals
Quarterly journals
Taylor & Francis academic journals